Laylah Ali (born 1968) is a contemporary visual artist known for paintings in which ambiguous race relations are depicted with a graphic clarity and cartoon strip format.

Early life and education
In her youth, Ali originally intended to be a lawyer or a doctor.

Ali received her B.A. (English and Studio Art) from Williams College, Williamstown, MA in 1991. She participated in the Whitney Independent Study Program at the Whitney Museum of American Art, New York City in 1992, and completed a residency at the Skowhegan School of Painting and Sculpture, Skowhegan, ME in 1993. Ali received her M.F.A. in 1994 from the Sam Fox School of Design & Visual Arts at Washington University in St. Louis. She lives and works in Williamstown, Massachusetts, and is currently a professor at Williams College.

Work
In Ali's earlier work, she would draw or paint something violent. She focused more on the action than the violence itself. In her current work, there is not a lot of focus on the act; she is more attentive to what happens before and after.

The works are small scale gouache paintings and drawings on paper. She is known to prepare for many months, planning out every detail so there is no room for mistakes. Ali's work is based on life experiences. Although one may not be able to tell, she says all of her work holds meaning and that what's in her mind transcends from her hands on paper. About the performative nature of her work, Ali says, "The paintings can be like crude stages or sets, the figures like characters in a play. I think of them equally as characters and figures."

The Greenheads Series
The subject of Ali's most well-known gouache paintings are the Greenheads – characters designed to minimize or eliminate categorical differences of gender, height, age, and in some ways race.  Ali created more than 80 of these paintings between 1996 and 2005. Ali drew on imagery and topics from newspapers, such as images of protest signs or world leaders hugging, but tweaked the stories in order to create something distant and new. Ali designed the characters and images to be specific and yet vague. They have meaning from Ali herself but the viewer brings their own references to interpret the image as well. Ali designed the characters to look human-like but not quite human so that they would be removed from our world and social context. They have a socio-political meaning yet they exist outside of our world.

Acephalous
Since 2015, Ali has been working on a series of paintings she calls Acephalous, featuring figures she describes as gender conscious, potentially sexual or sexualized, some of which have racial characteristics and some of which do not have heads. "They are on an endless, determined trek, a multi-part journey," she says. "It has elements of a forced migration."

Collaborations
Laylah Ali has collaborated with dancer/ choreographer Dean Moss at The Kitchen in 2005 with Figures on a Field and in 2014 with johnbrown. In 2002, the Museum of Modern Art, New York, commissioned Ali to create a wordless graphic novelette. In 2020 during the pandemic Ali was expected to complete a project with the Tamarind Press in New Mexico. The safety measures of COVID-19 demanded that the press and artist shift their working relationship to a virtual one. Instead of a project in-person they worked to utilize the mail to send work-in-progress back and forth.

Collections
Ali’s works are included in the permanent collections of numerous public institutions, including the Albright-Knox Art Gallery, Buffalo, NY; the Museum of Contemporary Art, Chicago and the Walker Art Center, Minneapolis, MN, among many others.

Exhibitions

Solo and group exhibitions
Laylah Ali has exhibited in both the Venice Biennial (2003) and the Whitney Biennial (2004). Other exhibitions are as follows:

 2017: Laylah Ali: Paintings and Drawings, Hallwalls Contemporary Arts Center, Buffalo, NY, November 10, 2017 — December 22, 2017
 2015-2016: University of Michigan Museum of Art, Ann Arbor, Michigan, October 17, 2015 – January 31, 2016
 2015-2016: ASSISTED, Kavi Gupta Gallery, Chicago, IL, September 12, 2015 – January 16, 2016 
 2015:  Blanton Museum of Art, University of Texas at Austin, Austin, Texas, February 17–May 15, 2016
 2015: Come as You Are: Art of the 1990s, Montclair Art Museum, Montclair, New Jersey, February 8–May 17
 2015: Telfair Museum of Art, Savannah, GA, June 12 – September 20
 2015: The Acephalous Series, PAUL KASMIN GALLERY, New York
 2014: Personal Histories, Seattle Art Museum, Seattle, Washington, July 5 – May 3, 2014 Up Every Evening, Season gallery, Seattle, Washington, spring
 2013: Laylah Ali: The Greenheads Series. Herbert F. Johnson Museum of Art at Cornell University, NY.
 2013: Laylah Ali: The Greenheads Series. Weisman Art Museum at the University of Minnesota;
 2013: The Shadows Took Shape, Studio Museum in Harlem, New York, NY (catalog)
 2013: Ambiguous Histories: Selected Art from the Exit Art Portfolios, Art, Design, and Architecture Museum, University of Santa Barbara, CA 
 2013: Laylah Ali & Gerald Cyrus, Pennsylvania College of Art and Design Gallery, Lancaster, PA Direct Democracy, Monash University Museum of Art, Melbourne, Australia (catalog)
 2013: Painting Between the Lines, Williams College Museum of Art, Williamstown, MA (catalog) 
 2013: Revelations: Examining Democracy, Broad Art Museum, Michigan State University, East Lansing, MI
 2012: Thenceforward, and Forever Free, Haggerty Museum of Art, Marquette University, Milwaukee, WI
 2012: Under the Influence: The Comics, Lehman College Art Gallery, Bronx, NY 
 2012: The Female Gaze: Women Artists Making Their World, Pennsylvania Academy of the Fine Arts, Philadelphia, PA (catalog)
 2011: The Air We Breathe, San Francisco Museum of Modern Art, San Francisco, CA (catalog) 
 2011: Painting Between the Lines, CCA Wattis Institute for Contemporary Arts, San Francisco, CA (catalog)
 2011: Relatos extraordinarios: Laylah Ali and Abigail Lazkoz, Sala Parpallo, Valencia, Spain (catalog)
 2011: Vivid: Female Currents in Painting, Schroeder Romero & Shredder, New York, NY
 2010: Works on paper from the MCA collection. Museum of Contemporary Art, Chicago; 
 2010: Collected: Reflections on the Permanent Collection, The Studio Museum in Harlem, New York, NY 
 2009: Off the Beaten Path: Violence, Women and Art, Art Works for Change—travelled to Stenersenmuseet, Oslo, Norway (2009); University Art Gallery, University of California, San Diego, CA (2009-2010); Centro Cultural Tijuana, Mexico (2010); Museo Universitario del Chopo, Mexico (2010); Chicago Cultural Center, Chicago, IL (2010); Global Health Odyssey Museum, Centers for Disease Control and Prevention, Atlanta, GA (2011) Paper Trail: A Decade of Acquisitions from the Walker Art Center, Figge Art Museum, Davenport, IA Massachusetts Review: Celebrating Fifty Years of Covers, University Gallery, Fine Arts Center, University of Massachusetts, Amherst, MA If I Didn’t Care: Generational Artists Discuss Cultural Histories, The Park School, Baltimore, MD 
 2008: Laylah Ali: Notes/Drawings/Untitled Afflictions, DeCordova Sculpture Park and Museum: August 30, 2008 - January 4, 2009 
 2008: Beyond Drawing: Constructed Realities, Ohio University Art Gallery, Athens Fantastical Imaginings, Delaware Center for the Contemporary Arts, Wilmington— travelled to Julio Fine Arts Gallery, Loyola University Maryland, Baltimore (2009); Political Circus, Florida Atlantic University, Ritter Art Gallery, Boca Raton; On the Margins, Mildred Lane Kemper Art Museum, Washington University in St. Louis, Missouri (catalog); Disguised, Rotwand Gallery, Zurich, Switzerland; Out of Shape, The Frances Lehman Loeb Art Center, Vassar College, Poughkeepsie, New York (catalog) 
 2008: Taking Possession, University of Arkansas at Little Rock Perverted by Theater, Apex Art, New York, NY; Pandora's Box, Dunlop Art Gallery, Regina, Saskatchewan, Canada (catalog) 
 2008: U-turn Quadrennial for Contemporary Art, Copenhagen, Denmark (catalog) 
 2008: Text/Messages: Books by Artists, Walker Art Center, Minneapolis
 2007: the kiss and other warriors. Institute of International Visual Arts, London; 
 2006: Alien Nation, Institute of Contemporary Arts, London—traveled to Manchester Art Gallery, Manchester, England; Sainsbury Centre for Visual Arts, Norwich, England (catalog) Cult Fiction, Hayward Gallery, London, England (catalog) 
 2006: Counterparts: Contemporary Painters and Their Influences, Virginia Museum of Contemporary Art, Virginia Beach, VA (catalog) Running Around the Pool, Florida State University Museum of Fine Arts, Tallahassee. FL (catalog) XXS, Sommer Contemporary Art Gallery, Tel Aviv, Israel American Matrix, Harn Museum of Art, University of Florida, Gainesville, FL Black Alphabet, Zacheta National Gallery of Art, Warsaw, Poland (catalog) Having New Eyes, Aspen Art Museum, Aspen, CO 
 2005: The Body. The Ruin, Ian Potter Museum of Art, University of Melbourne, Melbourne, Australia (catalog) Cut, Susanne Vielmetter Los Angeles Projects, Los Angeles, CA Vivi-Seccion: Dibujo Contemporaneo, Museo de Arte Carillo Gil, Mexico City, Mexico 
 2004: Whitney Biennial 2004, Whitney Museum of American Art, New York, NY (catalog) Material Witness, Museum of Contemporary Art, Cleveland, OH (catalog) The 10 Commandments, KW Institute for Contemporary Art, Berlin, Germany 
 2004: Laylah Ali: Types. Contemporary Art Museum St. Louis; 
 2003: Crosscurrents at Century’s End: Selections from the Neuberger Berman Art Collection, Henry Art Gallery, Seattle, WA—travelled to Norton Museum of Art, West Palm Beach, FL; Tampa Museum of Art, Tampa, FL; Chicago Cultural Center, Chicago, IL (catalog) 
 2003: Fault Lines: Contemporary African Art and Shifting Landscapes, Venice Biennale, Venice, Italy (catalog) 
 2003: me & more, Kunstmuseum Luzern, Switzerland (catalog) 
 2003: Splat Boom Pow! The Influence of Cartoons in Contemporary Art, Contemporary Arts Museum, Houston, TX—traveled to Institute of Contemporary Art, Boston, MA; Wexner Center for the Arts, Columbus, OH (catalog) 
 2002: Projects 75: Laylah Ali. Museum of Modern Art, New York;
 2002: Comic Release: Negotiating Identity for a New Generation, Carnegie Mellon University, Pittsburgh, Pennsylvania—traveled to Contemporary Arts Center, New Orleans, LA; University of North Texas Gallery, Denton; Western Washington University, Bellingham (catalog) Fantasyland, D’Amelio Terras, New York, NY First Person Singular, Seattle Art Museum, Seattle, WA Painting in Boston, DeCordova Sculpture Park and Museum, Lincoln, MA
 2001: Laylah Ali. Institute of Contemporary Art, Boston;
 2001: Against the Wall: Painting Against the Grid, Surface, Frame, Institute of Contemporary Art, University of Pennsylvania, PA Freestyle, The Studio Museum in Harlem, New York, NY (catalog)
 2001: FRESH: The Altoids Curiously Strong Collection 1998-2000, New Museum of Contemporary Art, New York, NY Guarene Arte 2001, Palazzo Re Rebaudengo, Turin, Italy 
 2001: A Work in Progress: Selections from the New Museum Collection, New Museum of Contemporary Art, New York, NY
 2000: Art on Paper 2000, Weatherspoon Art Museum, University of North Carolina, Greensboro, NC
 1999: Bizarro World! The Parallel Universes of Comics and Fine Art, Cornell Fine Arts Museum, Rollins College, Winter Park, FL Collectors Collect Contemporary, Institute of Contemporary Art, Boston, MA The 1999 DeCordova Annual Exhibition, DeCordova Sculpture Park and Museum, Lincoln, MA (catalog) 
 1999: No Place Rather than Here, 303 Gallery, New York, NY
 1998: Paradise 8, Exit Art, New York, NY Posing, Boston Center for the Arts, Boston, MA Selections Summer 1998, The Drawing Center, New York, NY Telling Tales, Atrium Gallery, University of Connecticut, Storrs, CT

Awards
Ali has been awarded a number of grants, residencies and awards, including the Joan Mitchell Foundation Painters and Sculptors Grant in 2008, the Joan Mitchell Foundation Residency in 2018, and the United States Artists Residency.

References

Further reading
Laylah Ali: The Greenheads Series, Williams College Museum of Art, Williamstown, MA, 2012.

External links
Laylah Ali: Meaning | Art21 "Exclusive"
artnet Asks: Laylah Ali
Laylah Ali | Dia Art Foundation

1968 births
Living people
American contemporary painters
African-American contemporary artists
American contemporary artists
African-American women artists
African-American painters
American women painters
Painters from New York (state)
21st-century American painters
21st-century American women artists
Skowhegan School of Painting and Sculpture alumni
21st-century African-American women
21st-century African-American artists
20th-century African-American people
20th-century African-American women
Sam Fox School of Design & Visual Arts alumni
Williams College alumni
Williams College faculty